Don Edward Wilhelms (born July 5, 1930) is a former United States Geological Survey geologist who contributed to geologic mapping of the Earth's moon and to the geologic training of the Apollo astronauts. He is the author of To a Rocky Moon: A Geologist's History of Lunar Exploration (1993), The geologic history of the Moon (1987), and he co-authored the Geologic Map of the Near Side of the Moon (1971) with John F. McCauley.  Wilhelms also contributed to Apollo Over the Moon: A View from Orbit (NASA SP-362).  He has also contributed to the study of Mars (including Mariner 9), Mercury, and Ganymede.

Biography
He was born July 5, 1930. Wilhelms was the recipient of the G. K. Gilbert Award in 1988. He received the Shoemaker Distinguished Lunar Scientist Award in 2010 at the Ames Research Center.

The mineral Donwilhelmsite is named after Wilhelms.  The fact that this mineral is formed only at high shock pressure such as that created by impacts is appropriate given the focus of Wilhelms' studies.

Minor planet 4826 Wilhelms is named in his honor.

References

External links
 Interview with Donald Wilhelms for NOVA series: To the Moon WGBH Educational Foundation, raw footage, 1998
 To A Rocky Moon, 1993, PDF version available from L&PI
 The geologic history of the Moon, 1987, PDF version available from USGS
 Astrogeology Science Center page on Wilhelms

Historians of science
American geologists
1930 births
Living people
Astrogeologists
Pomona College alumni
Planetary scientists